Intergovernmental can refer to:
Intergovernmentalism
Intergovernmental immunity (disambiguation)
Intergovernmental Risk Pool
Intergovernmental organization